Wilma Theater may refer to:

Wilma Theater (Philadelphia)
Wilma Theatre (Missoula, Montana)